Timothy Jason Peters (born August 29, 1980) is an American professional stock car racing driver. He last competed part-time in the NASCAR Camping World Truck Series, driving the No. 25 Chevrolet Silverado for Rackley WAR. He was a member of the Bobby Hamilton Racing and Richard Childress Racing driver development programs. Peters is a veteran of NASCAR's Truck Series, having driven for the defunct Red Horse Racing team full-time for eight years.

Racing career
He began his NASCAR career in 2005 in what was then the Craftsman Truck Series. He had two top-10 finishes in 16 events in the No. 4 Bailey's Cigarettes Dodge for Bobby Hamilton Racing. In 2006, he returned to the same truck during most of the year, earning one top-ten at Milwaukee. However, Peters left the team in early September and joined Richard Childress Racing, where he was to share their No. 21 AutoZone Chevy with Kevin Harvick in the Busch Series in 2007, before he was released after making six starts. He made two starts that season in the Truck Series, driving the No. 46 for Morgan-Dollar Motorsports, and had a ninth-place finish at Martinsville.

After making another start at Martinsville for Morgan-Dollar in 2008, he began driving the No. 17 for Premier Racing, a team that he co-owned. He and Premier ran a limited schedule in 2008 with a tenth-place run at Martinsville and was scheduled to run full-time in 2009. Peters scored two consecutive top-tens at Daytona and California, putting his team fourth in owners points. After Texas, Peters took both his sponsor and crew chief and joined Red Horse Racing for the remainder of the 2009 season. Peters won his first NASCAR Camping World Truck Series race on October 24, 2009, for Red Horse Racing at Martinsville Speedway, after pitting on lap 34 and making the distance. He came close of winning the last race at Homestead, but lost the lead with two laps to go, as Kevin Harvick won the race.

In 2010, Peters returned to Red Horse for the full season in the No. 17, and started the year off with a win the season-opener at Daytona after passing Todd Bodine on the last lap.

For 2011, Peters returned to RHR, and scored 12 top-10 finishes, as well as his third career win at the final race at Lucas Oil Raceway at Indianapolis. Peters would finish 2011 5th in points.

For 2012, Peters won his first race of the season at Iowa and would later follow that up with a flag to flag victory at Bristol.

For 2013, Peters won his first race of the season at Iowa while Erik Jones finished 2nd and would later follow that up with a victory at Las Vegas while Johnny Sauter finished 2nd.

In 2014, Peters passed Kyle Busch with 5 laps to go in the NextEra Energy Resources 250. However, Busch would beat Peters dramatically by 0.017 to win the race leading the 2010 Mountain Dew 250 at Talladega as the closest truck finish. Peters ran in the top five early at Iowa in July 2014, but got into an accident with Ron Hornaday Jr. In reply to Hornaday shoving Peters into the outside wall, Peters retaliated and spun Hornaday 2 laps after the previous collision. For his actions, NASCAR parked him for the rest of the race, though Peters was too damaged to continue so his parking made no difference in Peters' final result. Peters finished 31st.

For 2015, Peters got 2 wins, he won from the pole at Talladega for the Fred's 250 and got back to back victories, because he also won the previous year, and would follow up with another win at a wreck filled Phoenix race, the Lucas Oil 150, getting his 10th Truck career win, after Championship contenders Matt Crafton and Erik Jones wrecked while battling for the lead.

2016 saw the first winless season of Peters' full-time truck career, but nonetheless he qualified for the final round of the inaugural Truck chase and finished fourth in the standings.

In 2017, after a normal start to the year, on May 22 after the Charlotte race, Red Horse Racing closed down due to lack of sponsorship, an issue that had affected the team for years. This left Peters and teammate Brett Moffitt without rides. At the time of the team's shutdown, Peters was sixth in points. He drove a single race for MDM Motorsports at Texas Motor Speedway in his last start to date. Out of turn 4 on the second to last lap of the race, Austin Wayne Self got loose and hit the wall. Self then came back down and hit Peters causing him to spin into the grass. The front end dug into the grass and got lifted up in the air. The truck then spun 180 degrees, and the front of the truck came down. This caused the truck to launch 10-20 feet in the air and land on its roof. The truck slid for hundreds of feet and didn't flip back over. He was okay after the crash and finished 13th. Peters drove two races for Young's Motorsports, Las Vegas with an 11th-place finish, and Homestead with a 10th-place finish.

For the 2018 season, Peters joined RBR Enterprises at Martinsville, finishing seventh. He and the team attempted Charlotte too, but rain ended up canceling qualifying, which sent the team home. It was the first time in his career he failed to qualify for a race. In April 2018, he made his Monster Energy NASCAR Cup Series debut at Talladega, driving the No. 92 Advance Auto Parts / BB&T Ford Fusion for RBR. Peters and the team came back to Daytona in the summer, but failed to qualify. In late August, he began racing for GMS Racing in the truck series, occupying the No. 25 entry for the team due to the release of Dalton Sargeant. Peters won the Talladega race after avoiding a last lap crash involving Noah Gragson.

In 2019, Peters signed with Niece Motorsports to run the Truck Series' first three races in their No. 44 Chevrolet Silverado. He would also return to the No. 92 RBR truck for two races at Charlotte and Bristol, but he failed to qualify for both. The other race he ran that year was Talladega in the NEMCO Motorsports No. 87, attempting to defend his win from the prior year.

In 2020, Peters was without a ride all year until he got the call to substitute for Stewart Friesen in his No. 52 Toyota at Kansas in October. When the race was moved from Friday to Saturday of that weekend just weeks before, Friesen had already committed to run the Short Track Super Series Speed Showcase 200 dirt race, and because he was not in the Truck Series playoffs, decided to skip the Truck race. The team had previously announced Christopher Bell as Friesen's substitute, unaware that he was ineligible to compete due to Cup Series drivers being ineligible to run any Truck Series playoff races, which led to Peters getting the ride for that race.

In January 2021, it was announced that Peters would drive for Rackley WAR in the 2021 NASCAR Camping World Truck Series season. He departed the team in June after ten races; at the time, Peters was 21st in points with two top-twenty finishes.

Personal life
Peters married his longtime girlfriend, Sara Haskins Peters, on May 19, 2007. They have two children, a son named Brantley, born in 2012 and Macie, born in 2015.

Motorsports career results

NASCAR
(key) (Bold – Pole position awarded by qualifying time. Italics – Pole position earned by points standings or practice time. * – Most laps led. ** – All laps led.)

Monster Energy Cup Series

Busch Series

Camping World Truck Series

 Season still in progress
 Ineligible for series points

ARCA Re/Max Series
(key) (Bold – Pole position awarded by qualifying time. Italics – Pole position earned by points standings or practice time. * – Most laps led.)

References

External links
 
 

Living people
1980 births
Sportspeople from Danville, Virginia
Racing drivers from Virginia
NASCAR drivers
ARCA Menards Series drivers
Richard Childress Racing drivers